Gaspar Gálvez Burgos (born 7 July 1979) is a Spanish former professional footballer who played as a defender.

He started his career with Atlético Madrid, and went on amass La Liga totals of 156 games and one goal during eight seasons, also representing in the competition Oviedo, Valladolid, Albacete and Alavés. He added 208 matches and three goals in Segunda División, mainly at the service of Córdoba.

Club career
Gaspar was born in Córdoba, Andalusia. A product of Atlético Madrid's youth system, he made his first-team – and La Liga – debut on 3 January 1999 in a 3–2 away win against Racing de Santander where he came on as a late substitute, and alternated between the A and the B-sides for several years; at the end of his second professional season, the former were relegated.

After a six-month spell at Real Oviedo, with another top flight relegation, Gaspar signed with Real Valladolid for two seasons, after which he was re-bought by Atlético. He was released after one year, and was subsequently successively relegated from the top division with Albacete Balompié (where he scored his first goal as a professional, in a 1–1 draw at Levante UD on 18 December 2004) and Deportivo Alavés.

Gaspar then played two more years in the second level with the Basques, returning to hometown's Córdoba CF in 2008 also in that tier and alternating between the starting XI and the bench until his release in June 2013.

References

External links

1979 births
Living people
Footballers from Córdoba, Spain
Spanish footballers
Association football defenders
La Liga players
Segunda División players
Segunda División B players
Atlético Madrid B players
Atlético Madrid footballers
Real Oviedo players
Real Valladolid players
Albacete Balompié players
Deportivo Alavés players
Córdoba CF players
CD Mirandés footballers
SD Huesca footballers
Spain youth international footballers
Spain under-21 international footballers